Masters of Moral - Servants of Sin is the fourth album of the Austrian death metal band Pungent Stench. It was originally released in 2001 on Nuclear Blast. The album was recorded after the band had re-united. The lyrical content is more Christian-based (the cover also reflects that), though there are other themes such as school shootings ("School's out Forever") and paedophilia ("Rex Paedophilus" and "Suffer the Little Children to Come unto Me").

Track listing
All Songs Written By "Reverend" Martin Schirenc & Alex "Rector" Wank.
"Loot, Shoot, Electrocute" – 2:16
"School's out Forever" – 5:29
"Diary of a Nurse" – 4:14
"The Convent of Sin" – 5:25
"Rex Paedophilus" – 3:54
"Retaliation" – 4:36
"Suffer the Little Children to Come unto Me" – 5:32
"Viva il Vaticano" – 5:24
"Mortuary Love Affair" – 5:24
"The Testament of Stench" – 5:05

Personnel
"Reverend" Martin Schirenc: Guitars, Vocals
Reverend Mausna: Bass
Alex "Rector" Wank: Drums, Percussion

Pungent Stench albums
2001 albums
Nuclear Blast albums